The Social Network is the score album for David Fincher's 2010 film of the same name, composed by Trent Reznor and Atticus Ross. It was released on September 28, 2010, through The Null Corporation. On September 17, a five-track sampler was also made available for free. The score bears a similar sound to the previous Reznor/Ross 2008 collaboration, Ghosts I–IV, and even features two slightly reworked tracks from Ghosts; the track "Magnetic" (reworked from "14 Ghosts II") and "A Familiar Taste" (a remixed version of "35 Ghosts IV").

The soundtrack received positive reviews from critics, and widespread acclaim across the film industry. The score won nine major awards, including the 2010 Golden Globe award for Best Original Score – Motion Picture, and the Academy Award for Best Original Score at the 83rd Academy Awards.

Background
When Trent Reznor was originally asked by director David Fincher to score The Social Network, he initially declined, partly due to just finishing up a long touring and recording schedule. After further reflecting, Reznor apologized and told Fincher to keep him in consideration, to which he told Reznor that he had been waiting for him to accept.

On July 1, 2010, Reznor publicly announced that he and Ross were taking part in the soundtrack on nin.com:

The film initially had a "John Hughes vibe" to it, which concerned Reznor at first, but after meeting with Fincher and trying out different ideas with Atticus Ross, it turned out to work a lot more smoothly after all. Reznor recalled, "The whole process was fun for me because I liked answering to someone I respect and not having to make all the decisions for a change." Reznor and Ross would try sketches of songs, figuring they would have to revise it eventually, only for Fincher to get back to them and say, "I don't have anything bad to say – that's never happened before."

The idea of recording "In the Hall of the Mountain King" came from a scene at the Henley Royal Regatta and trying to find a song that would match up with its Edwardian era garden party theme. Fincher told them to try a Wendy Carlos version of it, which Reznor admits "threw [him] for a loop" and says it took four weeks to work on.

Packaging
The album's art was created by Nine Inch Nails' creative director Rob Sheridan, based upon the designs used to promote the film, mixed with Sheridan's style of image distortion. He explained the ideas, techniques and methods that made up the compositions that were used for the physical release:

Release
The first track from the soundtrack, "Hand Covers Bruise (No Piano)" debuted on The Social Networks website on August 30, 2010, streaming in the background. The album was released by The Null Corporation and distributed by Sony Music.

A five-track sampler for the album was released on September 17, on The Null Corporation's homepage.

On the day of the five-track sampler's launch, Reznor posted about the release on the Null Corporation's site:

The album was released for digital download on September 28, exclusively on Amazon MP3, and is available in three physical formats: CD, Blu-ray 5.1 surround audio and 2x12" vinyl record, released on October 11, 18 and 25 respectively. It was the first release from The Null Corporation to be marked with a Null number, being Null 01''' – a direct homage to the Nine Inch Nails halo numbers catalog system. For the tenth anniversary of the release, a Dolby Atmos mix was made available.

Every song in the film is on the soundtrack, with the exception of "Ball and Biscuit" by the White Stripes, "California über alles" by Dead Kennedys, "2 Ghosts I" by Nine Inch Nails, "Baby, You're a Rich Man" by The Beatles, "Like a Bad Girl Should" by The Cramps and "The Sound of Violence" by Dennis De Laat.

Promotion
On the album's official Facebook page, a five-day promotion for the movie was created on September 22, offering fans the chance to remix "On We March" and "In Motion" to win a chance to meet Ross and Reznor in Los Angeles, along with a seat at the film's première. The pair have since announced that they've planned for a remix EP to be released containing the best fan remixes, and that many more multitracks would be released for the purpose. However, neither the remix EP nor the additional multitracks came to fruition.

Reception

Critical reception

Critical response to the score was generally favorable, with an average rating of 76 out of 100 based on five professional reviews on Metacritic. The score debuted the following week at number one on the U.S. Billboard Soundtrack chart, and was largely well received by critics.  David from The Music Cycle awarded it five stars , four stars from AllMusic and Kerrang!, three-and-a-half stars from Movie Music UK, and three stars from Rolling Stone. Roger Ebert wrote positively of the score, calling it an "urgent composition that drove the film's headlong momentum". Adam Spunberg of Picktainment noted "how seamlessly it corresponds with the tenor of the film. Scene for scene, this smorgasbord of tracks fully encapsulates Mark Zuckerberg's – and Aaron Sorkin's – vision"; he commended the score for its "profound simplicity atop [the] turbulent background, whilst giving inventive modernity to other settings" and for portraying "Zuckerberg the genius, developing a brilliant idea over ominous undertones".

Much less enthusiastic was Christian Clemmensen, member of the International Film Music Critics Association and editor of Filmtracks, who said the score was "as redundantly insufferable as any score in recent memory, with no standout cues, no beginning, no end, no suspense, no adversity, and, most importantly, no sense of accomplishment". He awarded the score the very rare rating of FRISBEE, the lowest Filmtracks rating.

Accolades

Track listing

CD version

Vinyl version

Five Track Sampler

Award Sampler

A sampler released for consideration by awarding bodies gave a different track listing and many alternate titles, edits and mixes to the commercially available soundtrack, along with one track not on the previous soundtrack release.

Personnel
Credits for The Social Network'' adapted from liner notes:

 Trent Reznor and Atticus Ross – composition, arrangements, performance, programming, and production
 Adrian Belew – additional guitar (3, 14) {Ghosts I–IV: 35 Ghosts IV, 14 Ghosts II}
 Edvard Grieg – composition (on "In the Hall of the Mountain King")
 Blumpy – engineer
 Michael Patterson – mixing
 Rob Sheridan – design
 Tom Baker (at Precision Mastering, Hollywood, CA) – mastering

 David Fincher – executive producer
 Lia Vollack (for Columbia Pictures) – executive in charge of music
 Rebel Waltz, Inc. – Trent Reznor and Null management
 First Artists Management – Atticus Ross management

Chart positions

References

External links 
 Official website for the soundtrack
 Official website for the film

2010 soundtrack albums
Ambient soundtracks
Industrial soundtracks
Experimental music soundtracks
Albums produced by Atticus Ross
Albums produced by Trent Reznor
Albums free for download by copyright owner
Trent Reznor soundtracks
Atticus Ross soundtracks
The Null Corporation soundtracks
Scores that won the Best Original Score Academy Award